Allandale, Austin, Texas is a neighborhood in North Central Austin, in the U.S. State of Texas known for its large lots, mature trees, and central location.

The Allandale neighborhood boundaries are Burnet Road and the Brentwood and Crestview neighborhoods to the east, Mopac Expressway and the Northwest Hills neighborhood to the west, 45th Street and the Rosedale neighborhood to the south, and West Anderson Lane and the North Shoal Creek neighborhood to the north. The neighborhood is bisected by Shoal Creek Blvd, and its namesake, the perennial Shoal Creek.

Allandale history
The area now considered the Allandale neighborhood was originally part of an 1841 land grant to George W. Davis by the President of the Republic of Texas, Mirabeau B Lamar, for his service in the Battle of San Jacinto. Over the years, Davis (and his descendants) sold most of the 3,154 acres he was granted; however, the Davis family cemetery, a Texas Historical Cemetery, is in Allandale. A portion of the lands that the Davis family sold became part of Frank Richcreek's family farm, the Kirchner dairy farm, and smaller neighborhoods that were built in the 1930s. This changed in 1946 when W. Murray Graham, who was known as the “dean of the Austin real estate profession” and was instrumental in developing the Enfield, Tarrytown, and Bryker Woods neighborhoods, started platting the original sections of the Allandale neighborhood, soon followed by Allandale Oaks in 1951. Other sections of Allandale, including Allandale Terrace, Allandale Park, and Allandale West, were platted by other developers.

Allandale West

In 1958, Allandale West (the area north of Northland, south of Gullett Elementary School between the Union Pacific railroad tracks and Shoal Creek) was developed by Mr. W. H. Bullard. A long time neighborhood resident and friend of Mr. Bullard, John Miller provided insight on the naming of some of the street names in Allandale West:

 Bullard (Dr), Named after Mr. Bullard
 Clarice (Ct), Long time employee of Mr. Bullard's
 Carleen (Dr), Wife of the project's civil engineer
 Sarah (Ct), Mr. Bullard's secretary
 Gena (Ct), Daughter of Mr. Bullard's secretary
 Janey (Dr), Daughter of Mr. Bullard's secretary
 Louise (Ln), Mr. Bullard's mother's and daughter's name
 Marilyn (Dr), Wife of Mr. Bullard's law partner
 Susie (Ct), A long time Austin Club employee
 Rickey (Dr), Rickey Key, a close friend of Mr. Bullard
 Fairlane (Dr), Mr. Bullard's Ford Fairlane automobile
 Treadwell (Blvd), Named by a local optometrist

1981 Flood

On Memorial Day 1981, eleven inches of rain fell in three hours in some places in Austin. At the height of the storm around midnight, Shoal Creek, which normally flows at 90 gallons a minute was raging at 6.55 million gallons per minute.  By morning, 13 people were dead, hundreds of homes were destroyed, and Shoal Creek was clogged with dozens of new cars that had washed into the creek from a nearby dealership.

Plesiosaur Fossil Find

In 1991, local dentist and amateur paleontologist Robert McDonald found plesiosaur fossils in Shoal Creek near Greenlawn Parkway and Shoal Creek Blvd. A concrete stamp depicting the fossil is located at the Great Northern detention pond spillway.

Architecture
Most of the homes in Allandale are ranch style slab on grade homes. However, east of Shoal Creek Blvd, and south of Greenlawn Pkwy, are pockets of mid-century modern houses intermixed with the more traditional ranch style homes. However, increasingly in recent years, some empty lots and older homes, rather than being renovated, have been torn down and rebuilt into 21st century, modernist home designs.

Air Conditioned Village

A portion of Allandale, roughly bounded by Twin Oaks Dr to the south, Addison Ave to the north, Daugherty St to the east and Nasco Dr to the west played a unique role in proving that indoor air conditioning could be affordable and feasible in middle-class homes. The experimental Air Conditioned Village, sponsored by the National Association of Home Builders and studied by scientist at not only the University of Texas, but the US Department of Energy, opened in 1954 to assess the effects of air-conditioning on middle class residential design. Some of the development's original 22 homes are still standing and tell a fascinating story about how this small section of the Allandale played a pivotal role in bringing indoor air conditioning to the middle-class home.

Neighborhood traditions

4th of July Parade

In 1960, Rv. John Lovett had the idea of a neighborhood parade.  He was joined in organizing the first Allandale parade by the Frank Tuttles and another family or two. The 4th of July parade has been a neighborhood tradition ever since.

Candy Canes: The Holiday Tradition
In the early 1960s, the neighborhood began a unique project, the lighted Christmas candy canes.  Often thought of as a gift from the developers to those that purchased houses around Christmas, in reality the tradition was started by several of the neighborhood men walked Carleen and took orders,  about $2.50 per cane or $5.00 for a cane and floodlight.  Stovepipes were assembled in various garages, and then hung on a long wire for painting. The addition of a few yards of wide red plastic ribbon and a bow completed each cane.  The work crew even installed the canes to insure a uniform  angle and spacing.  As new streets were opened, the new neighbors were encouraged to join the candy cane project.  Within two years virtually every house had one or two lighted canes. In 1994 Cub Scout Pack 55 brought back the tradition of the Candy Canes as a fund raiser.

Neighborhood Wide Garage Sale
In 2005 a neighborhood wide garage sale was established. The purpose of the garage sale is to encourage neighbors to sell unwanted items that are still useful to others, and to engage with each other in a community-wide event. Unsold items are often collected by Allandale Neighborhood Association volunteers and donated to a local charity.

Neighborhood shopping
The eastern boundary of Allandale is Burnet Road, known for its quirky locally owned shops. Over time, some of the local shops have been replaced by boutique stores, bars, and restaurants.

Graham's Allandale Village
Opened at Burnet and Allandale Roads in 1950, at the time it was the largest suburban shopping center in town. It was meant to serve not just Allandale residents, but those living in the wider area in Crestview, Brentwood, Highland Park, Rosedale, and beyond.

Northcross Mall
is an indoor mall that opened in 1975 on the corner of Burnet Rd. & Anderson Ln., and was last renovated in 2004. It had 1,551 parking spaces (currently 2,048), a food court with 100 seats (now a number of individual restaurants), and what is thought to be Austin's first indoor ice skating rink (still operating). The mall covers an area of 336,688 square feet and has about 55 stores.

Cemeteries

Historic Davis Cemetery
Davis Cemetery, located on Vine St. between Twin Oaks and Cavileer Ave., is the family cemetery of George W. Davis, who was granted the surrounding land in 1841 for his service in The Battle of San Jacinto. It was dedicated as a historic cemetery on March 10, 2000. It contains about 100 graves ranging from the mid 1800s to 1918.

Austin Memorial Park Cemetery
Opened in 1927, the cemetery spans an area greater than 100 acres with over 100,000 single graves.

Neighborhood activism
The Allandale Neighborhood Association was organized in October 1973 as a 501C4 and is the 28th and largest neighborhood group in Austin. It is known for its civic activism and community engagement. The neighborhood association may have the biggest boundaries of any, encompassing 3,500 homes in an area roughly bounded by Anderson Lane to the North, Burnet Road to the East, 45th Street to the South, and MoPac Expressway to the West. The association works to promote and preserve the quality of life, the integrity, the safety, the residential character, and the property values of the neighborhood. It monitors zoning proposals, legislative issues, and City Council decisions regarding the streets, park, creek, and other concerns of the area. It sponsors candidate forums for the City Council, the school board, and other public offices when appropriate to provide information to the public. A select list of the achievements are outlined below:
1973 Halted the proposed extension of Far West Blvd. through Northwest Park. This effort prevented the neighborhood from being divided by a major roadway.
1974 Halted the proposed construction of a waste water line in the creek bed of Shoal Creek. It was relocated to run down Shoal Creek Blvd.
1975 Halted the proposed extension of Great Northern Blvd. from RM 2222 to Anderson Lane. This effort prevented the creation of an access road cutting through a residential area and endangering the safety of residents.
1975-1976 Initiated a neighborhood wide Neighborhood Watch programs.
1971-1984 Stopped the Allandale Baptist Church's (now GT church) controversial plan to demolish all the houses between Nasco Dr and Burnet Rd from Northland Dr and Allandale Rd.
1981 Achieved a zoning rollback for 99% of all single-family residences within the neighborhood to permanent "SF-2, Single Family Residence." This was the largest zoning rollback in the city.
1981 Coordinated the Allandale portion of the "Hike and Bike Trail" along Shoal Creek Blvd.
November 1985 Started hand publication and hand deliveries of the "Allandale Newsletter".
June 1993 Started mailing newsletters to all of Allandale's 3,500 homes.
June 1998 Worked with the Union Pacific Railroad, with the help of U.S. House of Representative's Lloyd Doggett's office, to prohibit prolonged idling of unmanned or staffed engines, along the western boundary of the neighborhood.
January 2001 Endorsed the plan to shrink Shoal Creek Boulevard from four lanes to two lanes, with shared biking and parking lanes on both sides of the street. This has since been changed to a dedicated biking lane on the west side of the road and a parking lane on the east side.
2006 Established a neighborhood-wide garage sale.
2006 Allandale Neighborhood News is distributed quarterly.
2006 Added an Allandale Neighborhood Association spring meeting

Infrastructure

Bus Transportation
Allandale has several Capital Metropolitan Transportation Authority bus lines that service the neighborhood. A few examples are 3, 5, 19, 320, 491, and Austin's second Capital MetroRapid the 803.

Highway
Burnet Rd is connected to US Highway 183 on the North, RM 2222 connects to Iinterstate Highway 35 on the East and Allandale Rd/Northland Dr connect to Mopac Expressway on the West.

Railroad
Union Pacific Railroad has freight tracks that run on the West Side of the neighborhood, between the neighborhood and Mopac Expressway. These tracks consist single track and a siding rail.

Demographics
According to the 2013 American Community Survey, the median age for Allandale was 37.8 years, and the median household income was $57,429. 45% of the residents were married, and 54% were single. 49% were male and 51% were female. Approximately 77% of the neighborhood's households had no one under the age of 18 living there. 12% of the population was over the age of 65. Among people over age 25, approximately 52% had a bachelor's degree or higher. Just over 20% of the neighborhood's total population were Hispanic American or Latino, while 72% of Allandale's population were White, 2.4% were Asian, and 2.1% were Black or African American.

Recreation
Beverly S. Sheffield Northwest District Park is in the heart of Allandale. One of the first recorded used of the park was as an old limestone quarry that supplied limestone for the 1853 Texas Capital Building.  The park which covers 31 acres contains:
 4 Barbecue Pits
 8 Baseball Fields
 1 Basketball Courts
 2 Fishing Piers
 47 Picnic Tables
 3 Playgrounds
 Olympic Sized Swimming Pools
 4 Tennis Courts
 1 Volleyball Courts
 1 pond
 Numerous walking and hiking trails

Northwest Park swimming pool consists of a kiddie pool, 50 meter lap lanes, a high dive diving board and 12 foot deep diving well.

 Gullett Elementary Park and Playground
Gullett Elementary on Treadwell Boulevard opened in 1956, Gullett Playground followed in 1962. It has seven ball fields, a sixth of a mile running track and three playgrounds.
 Lucy Read Elementary School Park
Lucy Read has three playgrounds, a covered basketball court and two soccer fields.
 Northwest Recreation Center
Northwest Recreation Center opened in 1979 and was named for the area of town for which it is located. The center contains: full court gymnasium, fitness studio, arts and crafts room, meeting room, multi-purpose room, teen room and a lobby with free wifi, ping pong, chess and foosball. Located on the grounds are: playscape, large grassy field, sand volleyball court, disc golf basket, horseshoe pit, and picnic tables.
 Great Northern Dog Park
Great Northern Dog Park is a mixed-use recreational area composed of a dam and retention ponds. It contains a large off-leash area for dogs, a small parking area, and multiple mixed-use paths. One of those paths connects to the Far West Blvd. / MoPac interchange via a pedestrian bridge over Great Northern Blvd.

Houses of worship
Neighborhood churches along Allandale Road included
 St. John's United Methodist, opened in 1949 with a school and sanctuary dating to 1952 and 1957.
 Allandale Baptist (now GT Austin), and opened in 1951 with a modernist sanctuary built in 1970.

Education
Allandale is entirely located in the Austin Independent School District. A majority of the neighborhood is served by Gullett Elementary School, but the southernmost portion is zoned to Highland Park Elementary School. All of Allandale attends Lamar Middle School and McCallum High School. Lamar opened on Burnet Road in 1955; its design by Kuehne, Brooks, and Barr was exhibited nationally and internationally. McCallum, the second oldest high school in the Austin Independent School District, opened in 1953 to relieve growth in north and northwest Austin. The school was named after AISD's first high school superintendent, A.N. McCallum. Despite serving the entirety of Allandale, it is not in the neighborhood itself, being located in neighboring Brentwood.

References

Neighborhoods in Austin, Texas